In mathematics, Harish-Chandra's c-function is a function related to the intertwining operator between two principal series representations, that appears in the Plancherel measure for semisimple Lie groups.   introduced a special case of it defined in terms of the asymptotic behavior of a zonal spherical function of a Lie group, and  introduced  a more general c-function called Harish-Chandra's (generalized) C-function.   introduced the Gindikin–Karpelevich formula, a product formula for Harish-Chandra's c-function.

Gindikin–Karpelevich formula

The c-function has a generalization cw(λ) depending on an element w of the Weyl group.
The unique element of greatest length
s0,  is the unique element that carries the Weyl chamber  onto . By Harish-Chandra's integral formula, cs0 is Harish-Chandra's c-function:

The c-functions are in general defined by the equation

where ξ0 is the constant function 1 in L2(K/M). The cocycle property of the intertwining operators implies a similar multiplicative property for the c-functions:

provided

This reduces the computation of cs to the case when s = sα, the reflection in a (simple) root α, the so-called 
In fact the integral involves only the closed connected subgroup Gα corresponding to the Lie subalgebra generated by  where α lies in Σ0+. Then Gα is a real semisimple Lie group with real rank one, i.e. dim Aα = 1,
and cs is just the Harish-Chandra c-function of Gα. In this case the c-function can be computed directly and is given by

where

and α0=α/〈α,α〉.

The general Gindikin–Karpelevich formula for c(λ) is an immediate consequence of this formula and the multiplicative properties of cs(λ), as follows:

where the constant c0 is chosen so that c(–iρ)=1 .

Plancherel measure

The c-function appears in the Plancherel theorem for spherical functions, and the Plancherel measure is 1/c2 times Lebesgue measure.

p-adic Lie groups

There is a similar c-function for p-adic Lie groups. 
 and  found an analogous product formula for the c-function of a p-adic Lie group.

References

Lie groups